The women's scratch race during the fourth round of the 2010–2011 UCI Track Cycling World Cup Classics was the only women's scratch race in this season. So the winner of this race won automatically the World Cup in this discipline. It took place in Manchester, United Kingdom on 19 February 2011. 33 Athletes participated in the contest.

Competition format
A scratch race is a race in which all riders start together and the object is simply to be first over the finish line after a certain number of laps. There are no intermediate points or sprints.

The tournament consisted of two qualifying heats of 7.5 km. The top twelve cyclist of each heat advanced to the 10 km final.

Schedule
Saturday 18 February
14:15-14:45 Qualifying
20:06-20:22 Finals
21:22-21:30 Victory Ceremony

Schedule from Tissottiming.com

Results

Qualifying

Qualifying Heat 1

Results from Tissottiming.com.

Qualifying Heat 2

Results from Tissottiming.com.

Final

Results from Tissottiming.com.

References

2011 in British sport
UCI Track Cycling World Cup – Women's scratch
2010–11 UCI Track Cycling World Cup Classics